Opisthotropis guangxiensis, the Guangxi mountain keelback,  is a species of natricine snake found in China.

References

Opisthotropis
Reptiles described in 1978
Reptiles of China